The sixteenth season of the American talent show competition series America's Got Talent was broadcast on NBC from June 1 to September 15, 2021. Although production was still impacted by the COVID-19 pandemic, live audiences were involved during audition sessions and live round stages of the competition. After Simon Cowell returned to his role on the program after an accident the previous year, the Judges Cuts round was replaced by him with a new deliberation format arrangement similar to that used in Britain's Got Talent. 

This season included the first group Golden Buzzer in the program's history, and the creation of a "Wildcard" special (which aired via online streaming service Peacock on August 10, 2021), following the withdrawal of a Golden Buzzer participant. The sixteenth season was won by magician Dustin Tavella, with aerialist Aidan Bryant finishing second, and stand-up comedian Josh Blue placing third. During its broadcast, the season averaged around 6.6 million viewers, excluding its online Wildcard special.

Production 
On February 24, 2021, the new season's line-up of judges and host was announced, revealing that Cowell would be returning, following an accident the previous year that had forced him to be absent in the fifteenth season's live episodes. Closed auditions were held across March and April, with footage taken from these undergoing final editing before the season's premiere at the beginning of June. A two-week hiatus in the broadcast schedule was also made, to avoid the NBC's live coverage of the postponed 2020 Summer Olympics between July and August.

The Judge Cuts round, which had been significantly modified in the previous season due to the disruption of production, was replaced by the deliberation format used by Britain's Got Talent. The judges conferred after the conclusion of auditions, to determine which acts would proceed to the live rounds. Some deliberations were filmed and used to fill in the remaining portions of the final audition episode for the season, as was done for the British edition.

Due to COVID-19 pandemic restrictions, the auditions were conducted with smaller audiences, augmented with stock footage of audiences from previous seasons and other editing techniques. With restrictions eased in California effective June 15, the live rounds returned to their usual home of the Dolby Theatre, but with audience members required to be vaccinated for COVID-19 and wear masks.

Season overview 
During auditions, the judges and host agreed to grant a group Golden Buzzer for the first time in the program's history. Although this would have meant six guaranteed places in the quarter-finals, singer Nightbirde later withdrew from the competition to focus on her battle with cancer, despite receiving a Golden Buzzer. As a result of this, her place was converted into a Wildcard slot, with the process conducted via a special episode on the streaming service Peacock on the same night as the first quarter-final. The process involved five participants picked from those who were eliminated during the deliberation phase, with viewers voting via Twitter over a three-day period on which of these would be their Wildcard in the third quarter-final.

Of the participants who auditioned this season, thirty-six secured a place in the live quarterfinals, with twelve quarter-finalists in each quarterfinal episode. Among these included: Northwell Nurse Choir, quick-change artist Léa Kyle, singer Jimmie Herrod, World Taekwondo Demonstration Team and classical singer Victory Brinker, who each received a Golden Buzzer; and singer Storm Large, a Wildcard act voted for during the Peacock special. About twenty-two quarter-finalists advanced to and were split between the two semi-finals, with 10 semi-finalists securing a place in the finals. The following below lists the results of each participant's overall performance in this season:

 |  |  |  |  | 
  America's Wildcard |  Wildcard Semi-finalist |  Golden Buzzer Audition

  Ages denoted for a participant(s), pertain to their final performance for this season.

Quarter-finals summary 
 Buzzed Out |  Judges' choice | 
 |  |

Quarter-final 1 (August 10) 
Guest Performers, Results Show: Brandon Leake & Darci Lynne

  Beyond Belief Dance Company were later brought back as a Wildcard act for the Semi-finals.

Quarter-final 2 (August 17) 
Guest Performers, Results Show: Kodi Lee, The Clairvoyants, and H.E.R.

Quarter-final 3 (August 24) 
Guest Performers, Results Show: Shin Lim & Lindsey Stirling

Semi-finals summary 
 Buzzed Out |  Judges' choice | 
 |  |

Semi-final 1 (August 31) 
Guest Performers, Results Show: Ben Platt & Preacher Lawson

  Due to the majority vote for World Taekwondo Demo. Team, Mandel's voting intention was not revealed.

Semi-final 2 (September 7) 
Guest Performers, Results Show: Deadly Games & Duo Transcend

Finals (September 14–15) 
Guest Performer, Finale: Idina Menzel

 |  |  | 

  Aidan Bryant and World Taekwondo Demo. Team conducted a joint routine for their second performance, and thus shared the same guest performers.
  Jimmie Herrod and Northwell Nurse Choir conducted a joint routine for their second performance, and thus shared the same guest performer.

Ratings 

  This episode was made available only online, via streaming service Peacock.

References 

2021 American television seasons
America's Got Talent seasons